Genovique Specialties Corporation was a Rosemont, Illinois based chemical company formed in 2005 by Arsenal Capital Partners out of the Velsicol Chemical business unit, which manufactured benzoic acid, sodium benzoate and specialty plasticizers. Its sites included Chestertown, Md., Kohtla-Järve, Estonia, and its joint venture in Wuhan, China.

In 2010 Genovique Specialties was purchased by Eastman Chemical Company.

References

External links
Official website

Chemical companies of the United States
Companies based in Cook County, Illinois
Rosemont, Illinois